Charaxes bocqueti, the Bocquet's demon charaxes, is a butterfly in the family Nymphalidae. It is found in Guinea, Sierra Leone, Ivory Coast, Ghana, Gabon, the Central African Republic and possibly Nigeria. The habitat consists of tropical evergreen forests.

Subspecies
C. b. bocqueti (Guinea, Sierra Leone, Ivory Coast, Ghana)
C. b. oubanguiensis Mining, 1975 (Gabon, Central African Republic, possibly Nigeria)

References

External links
African Charaxes/Charaxes Africains Eric Vingerhoedt as new synonym for Charaxes plantroui
Images of C. b. bocqueti Royal Museum for Central Africa (Albertine Rift Project)
Charaxes bocqueti images at Consortium for the Barcode of Life 
C. b. bocqueti images at BOLD
C. b. ubangiensis images at BOLD
African Butterfly Database Range map via search

Butterflies described in 1975
bocqueti